The 1952 United States Senate special election in Connecticut was held on November 4, 1952 to fill the vacancy left by the death of Brien McMahon. 

Incumbent Senator Prescott Bush, who won the special election, was later re-elected in 1956 to a full term in office over Democratic U.S. Representative Thomas J. Dodd.

Background
Senator Brien McMahon, whose term in office was scheduled to expire in 1957, died on July 28, 1952. William A. Purtell, who was already the Republican nominee for Connecticut's other Senate seat in a regularly scheduled election for the term expiring in 1959, was appointed to fill the seat until a successor could be duly elected. Purtell continued to stand in the regular election rather than run for the remainder of McMahon's term.

General election

Candidates
Prescott Bush, banker and candidate for U.S. Senate in the 1950 special election (Republican)
Abraham Ribicoff, U.S. Representative from Hartford (Democratic)
William J. Taft (Socialist)

Results

See also 
 1952 United States Senate elections

References 

Connecticut 1952
Connecticut 1952
1952 Special
Connecticut Special
United States Senate Special
United States Senate 1952